Christmas Is Here Again is a 2007 American animated Christmas musical-comedy-fantasy-adventure film distributed by Screen Media Films, also known as Who Stole Santa's Sack?   The first feature production from the Renegade Animation studio, it was co-written, co-produced and directed by Robert Zappia.  Narrated by Jay Leno, the film features the voices of Edward Asner, Kathy Bates, Madison Davenport, Colin Ford, Brad Garrett, Andy Griffith, Shirley Jones, Norm Macdonald, and Daniel Roebuck, and marked Asner's fourth role in a Christmas-themed film after the 1977 film The Gathering, 1999 film Olive, the Other Reindeer and 2003 film Elf, though unlike the latter two films, he does not play Santa.

Synopsis
Sophiana, an orphan girl who carries a cane, sets out to find Santa's toy sack (which is a magical source of toys since it was made from the baby Jesus' swaddling clothes), which was stolen thirty years previously by Krad ("dark" spelled backwards) in revenge after Santa stopped handing out Krad's coal to naughty children. She is helped in her quest by Paul Rocco, one of Santa's elves, Dart, a reindeer calf, Buster the fox, and his friend, Charlee the polar bear.

Cast
Madison Davenport as Sophiana, a girl from an orphanage who's been bullied by Miss Dowdy and the other children
Daniel Roebuck as Paul Rocco/Jacque
Colin Ford as Dart
Norm Macdonald as Buster
Brad Garrett as Charlee
Ed Asner as Krad
Michael Norris as the Selves
Kathy Bates as Miss Dowdy, the woman who is the owner of the orphanage, she is seen more like a "antagonist" to Sophiana.
Andy Griffith as Santa Claus
Shirley Jones as Victoria Claus
Jay Leno as the Narrator
 Randy Crenshaw/Bob Joyce/Sally Stevens/Susie Stevens Logan/Gary Stockdale/Carmen Twillie (actress)/Lauren Wood as Chorus

Production
Renegade Animation, an animation company located in Glendale, California and known for the TV series Hi Hi Puffy AmiYumi and The Mr. Men Show, teamed up with Easy to Dream Entertainment to create Christmas Is Here Again. A small crew spent nine months on the principal animation, which was completed in mid-2006.

One of the songs in the film's soundtrack (as well as the film's working title) was "Who Stole Santa's Sack?"

Awards and release
Christmas Is Here Again premiered on October 20, 2007, as an official selection at the Heartland Film Festival. The following year, it received an Annie Award nomination for Best Voice Acting in an Animated Television Production (Madison Davenport as Sophiana). Additionally, in 2009, Christmas is Here Again was nominated for the Annie Award for Best Animated Home Entertainment Production. Colin Ford, the voice of Dart, was also nominated for a Young Artist Award in 2009 for Best Performance in a Voice-Over Role - Young Actor.

The film was received its DVD debut in the U.S. on November 4, 2008. The disc contains a behind-the-scenes featurette, cast interviews and "Name the Reindeer", as extras.

Originally, the reindeer on the DVD cover had a red nose akin to Rudolph's. On the final version of the cover, it is black.

Reception
Richard Propes of The Independent Critic website gave it an A and 3.5 stars, calling it "an ideal choice for families, children and for Scrooges like myself who, somewhere deep inside, still want to believe". However Common Sense Media gave the film a 2 out of 5 saying "Small children might like this holiday musical, but they may also lose patience at the 73-minute length".

Stage version
The Pacific Conservatory Theatre presented the premiere of a stage adaptation of Christmas Is Here Again by Brad Carroll and Jeremy Mann in November and December 2014.

See also
List of animated feature-length films
List of Christmas films
Santa Claus in film

References

External links

 
 
 
 

2007 films
American adventure films
American flash animated films
American children's animated adventure films
American children's animated fantasy films
American children's animated musical films
American Christmas films
American fantasy films
American fantasy adventure films
American fantasy comedy films
American musical films
American musical comedy films
Direct-to-video animated films
2000s American animated films
Animated Christmas films
Animated films about bears
Animated films about foxes
Animated films about orphans
2007 animated films
2000s fantasy adventure films
2000s musical comedy films
2000s Christmas films
2007 comedy films
2000s English-language films